{{DISPLAYTITLE:C7H8N4O2}}
The molecular formula C7H8N4O2 (molar mass: 180.16 g/mol) may refer to:

 Paraxanthine
 Theobromine
 Theophylline

Molecular formulas